The United States federal Transportation Equity Act for the 21st Century (TEA-21) is a federal transportation bill enacted June 9, 1998, as  and . TEA-21 authorized federal surface transportation programs for highways, highway safety, and transit for a 6-year period from 1998 to 2003. Because Congress could not agree on funding levels, the Act, which had continued past 2003 by means of temporary extensions, was allowed to lapse.

History
The bill was introduced in the House by Bud Shuster (R–PA) on September 4, 1997. 
The transportation equity act requires that seven planning factors be included in regional transportation plans. The plans must:
 support the economic vitality of the metropolitan planning area, especially by enabling global competitiveness, productivity and efficiency;
 increase the safety and security of the transportation system for motorized and non-motorized users ;
 increase the accessibility and mobility options available to people and for freight;
 protect and enhance the environment, especially by promoting energy conservation and improving quality of life;
 enhance the integration and connectivity of the transportation system across and between modes, for people and freight; 
 promote efficient system management and operation; and
 emphasize the efficient preservation of existing transportation systems.

Factor 4 was amended by the Safe, Accountable, Flexible, Efficient Transportation Equity Act (SAFETEA-LU) in 2005 and reads: "protect and enhance the environment, promote energy conservation, improve the quality of life, and promote consistency between transportation improvements and State and local planned growth and economic development patterns".

Section 1211(d) prevents the United States Department of Transportation (USDOT) from requiring state departments of transportation to use the metric system. This has had the effect of delaying metrication in the United States with respect to road construction, though some states had already completely converted.

Funding programs
JARC (Job Access Reverse Commute)

See also
Surface Transportation and Uniform Relocation Assistance Act
Intermodal Surface Transportation Efficiency Act (ISTEA, 1991)
Moving Ahead for Progress in the 21st Century Act (MAP-21, 2012)

References

External links
TEA-21 official web site
 Transportation Equity Act for the 21st Century (PDF/details) as amended in the GPO Statute Compilations collection

Equity Act
Acts of the 105th United States Congress
1998 in American law